Grzegorz Krawców (born 25 July 1962) is a Polish sprint canoer who competed in the late 1980s and early 1990s. He won three medals at the ICF Canoe Sprint World Championships with two silvers (K-4 500 m: 1987, K-4 1000 m: 1989) and a bronze (K-4 1000 m: 1986).

Krawców also competed in two Summer Olympics, earning his best finish of fifth in the K-4 1000 m event at Seoul in 1988.

References

1962 births
Canoeists at the 1988 Summer Olympics
Canoeists at the 1992 Summer Olympics
Living people
Olympic canoeists of Poland
Polish male canoeists
People from Nowa Sól
ICF Canoe Sprint World Championships medalists in kayak
Sportspeople from Lubusz Voivodeship